The Bear Valley Electric Service Inc. (BVES),  is the utility that provides electricity to the Big Bear valley in the San Bernardino Mountains, California, United States.  It is a subsidiary of the American States Water Company.

History
Bear Valley Electric Service was established in the Big Bear Valley in 1929.

References

External links
 

Electric power companies of the United States
Big Bear Valley
Energy in California
Companies based in San Bernardino County, California